Wawrzyniec Jerzy Żuławski (14 February 1916, in Zakopane – 18 August 1957, in the Alps), also known as Wawa, was a Polish alpinist, educator, composer, music critic, and musicologist. He was a professor of Państwowa Wyższa Szkoła Muzyczna in Warsaw. Żuławski was an initiator and organiser of Polish alpinism. During World War II he was a member of Armia Krajowa and was a soldier during the Warsaw Uprising.

Żuławski published music reviews in Ruch Muzyczny, Express Wieczorny, Nowa Kultura. He also composed orchestral, chamber, piano and vocal pieces.

He was one of the leading Polish alpinists. He died on Mont Blanc during a rescue action in 1957.

Notable works

Compositions
 Cztery kolędy polskie, orchestral compositions, 1947
 Wierchowe nuty, vocal compositions for choir and violin solo, 1955

Books
Żuławski was an author of several mountain-related books:
 Niebieski krzyż, 1946
 Sygnały ze skalnych ścian, 1954
 Tragedie tatrzańskie, 1956
 Skalne lato, 1957

Family tree

References 

1916 births
1957 deaths
Mountaineering deaths
Polish composers
Polish educators
Polish mountain climbers
Polish male non-fiction writers
People from Zakopane
20th-century composers
Male composers
Polish music critics
Home Army members
20th-century Polish writers
20th-century Polish male writers
20th-century male musicians